Sayeem popularly known as Sayeem Rana (born 1 March 1975) is a Bangladeshi singer, composer, music director, poet and professor. He won Bangladesh National Film Awards in best music director category for the film Nekabborer Mohaproyan in 2014. and Prothom Alo Best Book Award 1416. He is the assistant professor at the Department of Music of Dhaka University.

Early life
Rana was born on 1 March 1975 at the village of Jugia Dargah Para in Kushtia District of Bangladesh to Abdus Sobhan and Amina Khatun. He graduated in June 1996 and obtained his post-graduate degree in January 1997 in Islamic studies from Dhaka University. In January 2009, he earned his PhD degree on the title Mass Music of Bangladesh: Subject and Tune Variation from the same university in the department of theatre and music.

Career
Rana joined the Department of Film and Media of Stamford University Bangladesh as a part-time lecturer in 2010. In 2015, he  joined University of Dhaka as a lecturer at the Department of Music under the Faculty of Arts.

References

External links
 

1975 births
Living people
Best Music Director National Film Award (Bangladesh) winners
People from Kushtia District
Bangladeshi male singer-songwriters
Bangladeshi music directors
Bangladeshi musicians
Bangladeshi poets